USS Eleanor (SP-677) was a United States Navy patrol vessel in commission from 1917 to 1918.

Eleanor was built as the private motorboat Tringa by Murray and Tregurtha at South Boston, Massachusetts, in 1910. She later was renamed Eleanor.

In June 1917, the U.S. Navy acquired Eleanor under a free lease from her owner, C. B. Houghton of Corning, New York, for use as a section patrol boat during World War I. She was commissioned as USS Eleanor (SP-677) on 9 July 1917.

Assigned to the 1st Naval District in northern New England, Eleanor carried out patrol duties in the Boston, Massachusetts, area through the end of World War I.

Eleanor was decommissioned on 12 December 1918 and returned to Houghton on 14 April 1919.

References

Department of the Navy Naval History and Heritage Command Online Library of Selected Images: Civilian Ships: Eleanor (American Motor Boat, 1910). Previously named Tringa. Served as USS Eleanor (SP-677) in 1917–1919
NavSource Online: Section Patrol Craft Photo Archive Eleanor (SP 667)

Patrol vessels of the United States Navy
World War I patrol vessels of the United States
Ships built in Boston
1910 ships